Frontier Gunlaw is a 1946 American Western film directed by Derwin Abrahams and written by Bennett Cohen. The film stars Charles Starrett, Tex Harding, Dub Taylor, Jean Stevens, Weldon Heyburn and Jack Rockwell. The film was released on January 31, 1946, by Columbia Pictures.

Plot

Cast          
Charles Starrett as Jim Stewart / The Durango Kid
Tex Harding as Tex Harding
Dub Taylor as Cannonball
Jean Stevens as Kitty Harding
Weldon Heyburn as Matt Edwards
Jack Rockwell as Hank Watson
Frank LaRue as Sheriff Kincaid
John Elliott as Pop Evans
Bob Kortman as Mace 
Stanley Price as Sam
Al Trace as Al Trace
Jack Guthrie as Jack Guthrie

References

External links
 

1946 films
American Western (genre) films
1946 Western (genre) films
Columbia Pictures films
Films directed by Derwin Abrahams
American black-and-white films
1940s English-language films
1940s American films